The Raymond Grain Elevators Historic District  is a  historic district near Raymond, Montana with six contributing buildings which was listed on the National Register of Historic Places in 1993.

It includes two surviving grain elevators located within the railway right-of-way. Elevator The railway was built in 1913 by the Minneapolis, St. Paul, & Sault Ste. Marie Railroad (the "Soo Line") and was operated by that company until 1990.

References

Historic districts on the National Register of Historic Places in Montana
Buildings and structures completed in 1913
Grain elevators
Sheridan County, Montana